Anil Misra is an Indian American professor of civil engineering at the University of Kansas. There he also serves as the associate director for the KU Institute of Bioengineering Research (IBER).

Career
Misra pioneered the method of granular micromechanics to develop generalized continuum models for a range of materials including geomaterials, biomaterials, concrete, polymers, and metamaterials. In addition to his work in granular micromechanics, Misra has contributed to dental interfacial mechanics and high-resolution material characterization. He was elected a fellow of the American Institute for Medical and Biological Engineering (AIMBE) in 2013, of the American Society of Civil Engineers (ASCE) in 2017, and of the Engineering Mechanics Institute in 2018. Additionally, he received the 2017 Eugenio Beltrami Senior Scientist Prize presented annually by the International Research Center on Mathematics & Mechanics of Complex Systems (M&MoCS). In 2018, Misra was selected as a Fulbright specialist to the Warsaw University of Technology in Poland. Misra has published over 300 articles, co-edited four books, and guest-edited five special issue journals. He has over 6,000 citations, an h-index of 47, and an i10-index of 132.

References 

University of Kansas faculty
People from Dehradun
Living people
Year of birth missing (living people)